Thorington Tower is a mountain in Alberta, Canada. It is located near the north branch of Lynx Creek in Jasper National Park.

Mount Palmer lies 1½ km west of the tower. The mountain was named in 1967 after J. Monroe Thorington, an American ophthalmologist who climbed extensively in the Selkirks and the Canadian Rockies during the 1920s and 1930s. First ascent was by Don Lashier and Charlie Raymond in September 1967.

See also
 Geography of Alberta

References

Three-thousanders of Alberta
Winston Churchill Range
Mountains of Jasper National Park